Kimmo Lotvonen (born January 11, 1976 in Oulu, Finland) is a defenceman for the Leksands IF hockey team in the Swedish HockeyAllsvenskan league.

Career statistics

External links

References 

 
 

1976 births
Finnish ice hockey defencemen
Oulun Kärpät players
Living people
Leksands IF players
Lukko players
Timrå IK players
Sportspeople from Oulu